The R12 Regional Highway is a highway in the Volta Region of Ghana. It starts from Akatsi in the west to Akanu on the border with Togo. It is 30 kilometres in length.

Akatsi South District
The R12 starts at a junction complex with the N1 national highway at Akatsi, the capital of the Akatsi South District. It also intersects the R14 regional highway within Akatsi as it heads east. It runs past Lagbo and continues into the Ketu North Municipal District.

Ketu North Municipal District
The R12 continues into the Ketu North Municipal District where it passes through Tadzewu before reaching the district capital, Dzodze. AT Dzodze, the R10 regional highway from Denu to Ho intersects it from south to north. The R12 runs for a short distance southwards along the R10 before continuing east to Akanu on the border with Togo. It continues across the border into Togo and carries on from Noepe to Agouenyive.

See also 
Ghana Road Network

References

External references
 R12 on OpenStreetMap

Roads in Ghana